In enzymology, an aerobactin synthase is an enzyme that catalyzes the chemical reaction

4 ATP + citrate + 2 N6-acetyl-N6-hydroxy-L-lysine + 2 H2O  4 ADP + 4 phosphate + aerobactin

The 4 substrates of this enzyme are ATP, citrate, N6-acetyl-N6-hydroxy-L-lysine, and H2O, whereas its 3 products are ADP, phosphate, and aerobactin.

This enzyme belongs to the family of ligases, specifically those forming carbon-nitrogen bonds as acid-D-amino-acid ligases (peptide synthases).  The systematic name of this enzyme class is citrate:N6-acetyl-N6-hydroxy-L-lysine ligase (ADP-forming). This enzyme is also called citrate:6-N-acetyl-6-N-hydroxy-L-lysine ligase (ADP-forming).  This enzyme participates in lysine degradation.

References

 
 
 
 
 

EC 6.3.2
Enzymes of unknown structure